
Oświęcim County is a unit of territorial administration and local government (powiat) in Lesser Poland Voivodeship, southern Poland. It came into being on January 1, 1999, as a result of the Polish local government reforms passed in 1998.

As of 2006 its total population is 153,390, out of which the population of Oświęcim is 40,979, that of Kęty is 19,252, that of Brzeszcze is 11,730, that of Chełmek is 9,065, that of Zator is 3,726, and the rural population is 68,638.

The county contains the sites of the Auschwitz concentration camp complex (Auschwitz being the German name for Oświęcim).

Neighbouring counties
Oświęcim County is bordered by the city of Jaworzno to the north, Chrzanów County to the north-east, Wadowice County to the south-east, Bielsko County to the south, Pszczyna County to the west and Bieruń-Lędziny County to the north-west.

Administrative division
The county is subdivided into nine gminas (one urban, four urban-rural and four rural). These are listed in the following table, in descending order of population.

References
Polish official population figures 2006

 
Land counties of Lesser Poland Voivodeship